Diego Pacheco Téllez-Girón Gómez de Sandoval, also called Diego Fernández de Velasco y Pacheco or Diego Pacheco Telles Giron Fernandez de Velasco y Enrique (1754 – Paris, 1811), was a Spanish noble and politician, who supported the French during the Peninsular War, and who was therefore known as an Afrancesado.

Family 

He was the son of Andrés Manuel Alonso Téllez-Girón Pacheco y Toledo and María Portería Fernández de Velasco y Pacheco. His mother was the daughter of Bernardino Fernández de Velasco, 11th Duke of Frías, who was succeeded by his brother Martín Fernández de Velasco y Pimentel. When the 12th Duke died in 1776 without children, the title of 13th Duke of Frías went to Diego, who called himself since then Diego Fernández de Velasco y Pacheco.

Pedro had an impressive collection of titles :

 Grandee of Spain
 Duke of Frías nº 13.
 Duke of Escalona n° 13.
 Duke of Uceda nº 8.
 Count of Alba de Liste nº 18.
 Count of Alcaudete nº 14.
 Count of Fuensalida nº 16.
 Count of Oropesa nº 16.
 Count of Peñaranda de Bracamonte nº 9
 Count of Haro (last).
 Marquess of Frómista nº 10.
 Marquess of Villena nº 13.

He was also a Knight in the Order of the Golden Fleece since 1808.

He married with Doña Francisca de Paula de Benavides de Córdoba, and one son, called Bernardino Pacheco Téllez-Girón y Benavides. When Pedro died, he also changed his name to Bernardino Fernández de Velasco y Pacheco.

Career

In 1798, during the reign of Charles IV of Spain, Pedro was ambassador in Portugal.
When the French invaded Spain in 1808, he chose their side and received some important functions in the government of Joseph Bonaparte. He played an important role in editing the Bayonne Statute, which was approved on 8 July 1808.

Diego died in 1811 in France, where he was Spanish ambassador. He was buried in the Père Lachaise Cemetery in París.

References

Bibliography

 Ignacio FERNÁNDEZ SARASOLA . La Constitución de Bayona, (1808). Edit. IUSTEL. Referencia Iustel: 91907001 ;  Colección Las Constituciones Españolas . 432 pages, (edited November 2007).

1754 births
1811 deaths
115
Afrancesados
113
113
108
Knights of the Golden Fleece of Spain
Counts of Alba de Liste
Grandees of Spain
Spanish nobility